Lieutenant Colonel Patrick Roy Holcroft  (born March 1948) is an English retired soldier and banker who is the present Lord-Lieutenant of Worcestershire, the British monarch's personal representative in the county.

Career
He was educated at Downside School, the University of Nottingham (BA, 1972), and at the Royal Military Academy Sandhurst. He served 19 years in the Grenadier Guards, rising to the rank of lieutenant colonel, before pursuing a career in the City of London with the UK merchant banking group Robert Fleming & Co. in 1988.

Holcroft remained with the bank as CEO of its Lloyds re-insurance broking business and a director of the investment management business until the bank was acquired in 2000 by Chase Manhattan Bank.  Following a buyout, he became CEO of the  renamed RFIB  group. He remained CEO of the group until 2009, becoming a non executive director until 2012. He was also a non executive director of the Griffin Insurance Association until 2012 and a non executive director of Thomas Miller Holdings until 2016.

Holcroft was born and brought up in Worcestershire, became a Deputy Lieutenant of Worcestershire in 2009 and was appointed to his present position on 28 December 2012. He was appointed Officer of the Order of the British Empire (OBE) in the 1987 New Year Honours, Lieutenant of the Royal Victorian Order (LVO) in the 2013 New Year Honours, Commander of the Order of St John (CStJ) in 2018 and Commander of the Royal Victorian Order (CVO) in the 2022 Birthday Honours.

He is a trustee or adviser to The Grenadier Guards, Nuffield Trust for the Forces of the Crown; the Royal Military Academy Sandhurst; The Hedley Foundation, which supports young people, the disabled and the terminally ill; and until 2014 the Lloyd's Patriotic Fund. He is also President or Patron of a number of Worcestershire based charities, including New College Worcester, Worcestershire Ambassadors, The Worcestershire Community Foundation, Worcestershire and Dudley Historic Churches; and he is a member of the Council of Worcestershire Cathedral.

Personal life
He lives near Tenbury Wells and is married to former Vanity Fair publisher Annie Roberts Holcroft (since 1982). They have three sons: former soldier Oliver James (born 1985), actor Edward Patrick (born 1987) and Thomas William (born 1992).

References

1948 births
Living people
People educated at Downside School
Alumni of the University of Nottingham
Lord-Lieutenants of Worcestershire
Commanders of the Royal Victorian Order
Officers of the Order of the British Empire
Grenadier Guards officers